= 301 Howard Street =

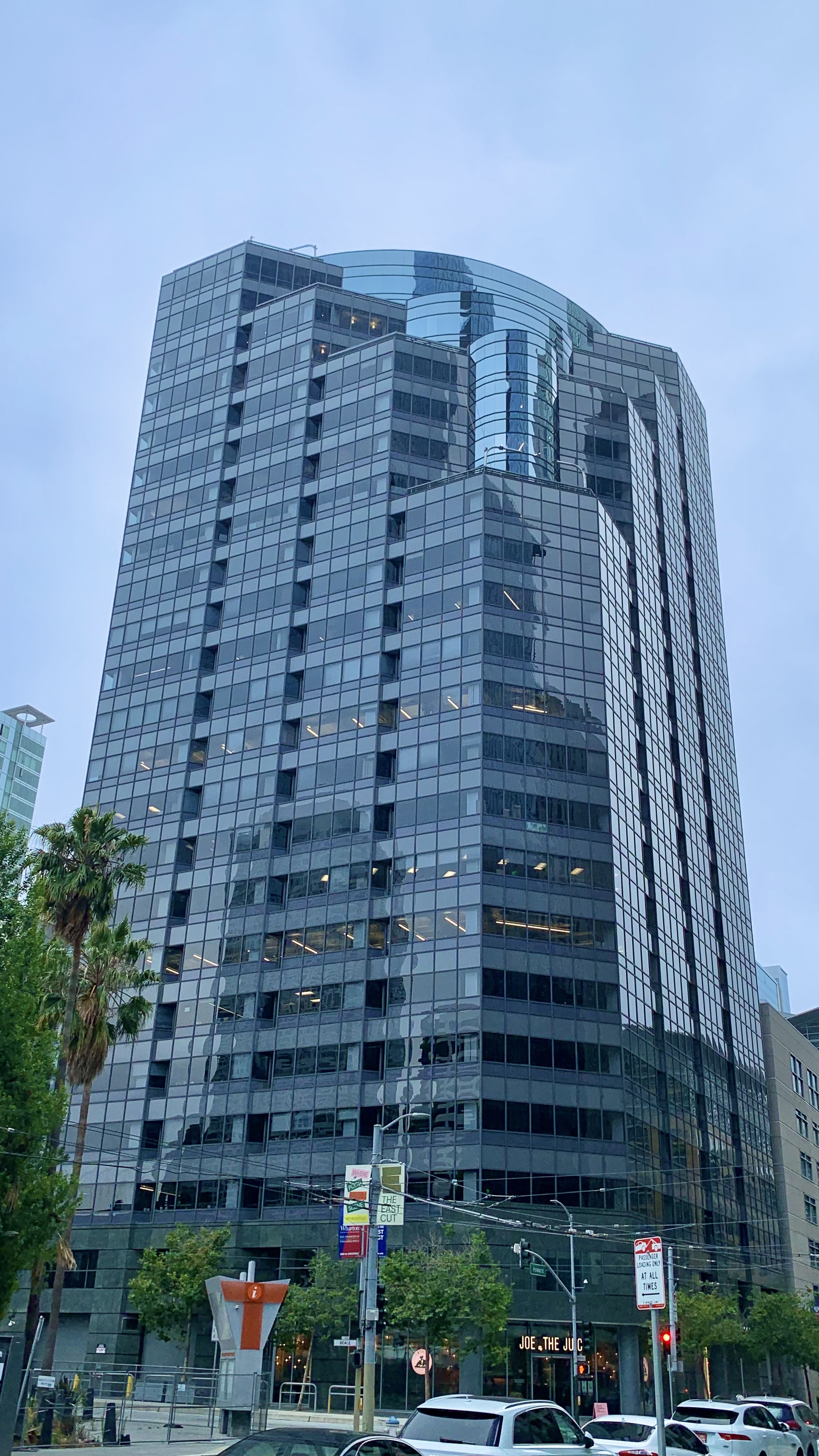
- In July 2021

- Location within San Francisco 301 Howard Street (California) 301 Howard Street (the United States)
- Alternative names: Real Estate Industries Building

General information
- Type: Commercial offices
- Location: 301 Howard Street; San Francisco, California
- Coordinates: 37.78957100733937°N 122.39437952595222°W
- Completed: 1988

Height
- Roof: 307 ft (94 m)

Technical details
- Floor count: 23

Design and construction
- Architect: Gensler

301 Howard Street is a twenty-three-floor, 307-foot (94 m) skyscraper in San Francisco, California, completed in 1988.
